Ivan Edgar Wyatt (5 January 1924 – 26 March 2009) was a New Zealand cricketer. He played three first-class matches for Auckland in 1947/48.

Wyatt was a schoolteacher. An opening batsman, he made 67 and 47 in his first first-class match for Auckland against Canterbury and was considered a possible inclusion in the touring team to England in 1949, but he played no first-class cricket after the 1947–48 season. He later represented Northland and Nelson in the Hawke Cup. When Nelson withstood a challenge from Poverty Bay in 1958-59 he scored 202 in Nelson's first innings.

See also
 List of Auckland representative cricketers

References

External links
 

1924 births
2009 deaths
New Zealand cricketers
Auckland cricketers
Cricketers from Auckland